The following railroads operate in the U.S. state of Indiana.

Common freight carriers
Canadian National Railway (CN) through 3 subsidiaries:
Wisconsin Central  (WC)
Elgin, Joliet and Eastern Railway - now part of Wisconsin Central(EJE)
Grand Trunk Western Railroad (GTW)
Illinois Central Railroad (IC)
Canadian Pacific Railway (CP) through 1 subsidiary:
Soo Line Railroad (SOO)
Central Indiana and Western Railroad (CEIW)
Central Railroad of Indiana (CIND)
Central Railroad of Indianapolis (CERA)
Chesapeake and Indiana Railroad (CKIN)
Chicago, Fort Wayne and Eastern Railroad (CFE)
Chicago South Shore and South Bend Railroad (CSS)
C&NC Railroad (CNUR)
CSX Corporation (CSX) through 2 subsidiaries:
CSX Transportation (CSXT)
Baltimore and Ohio Chicago Terminal Railroad (BOCT)
Dubois County Railroad (DCRR)
Elkhart and Western Railroad (EWR)
Elkhart and Western Railway (EWRY)
Operates the Fulton County Railroad (FC)
Evansville Western Railway (EVWR)
Gary Railway (GRW)
Grand Elk Railroad (GDLK)
Honey Creek Railroad (HCRR)
Hoosier Southern Railroad (HOS)
Indian Creek Railroad (ICRK)
Indiana Rail Road (INRD)
Indiana Eastern Railroad (IERR)
Indiana Harbor Belt Railroad (IHB)
Indiana Northeastern Railroad (IN)
Indiana and Ohio Railway (IORY)
Indiana Southern Railroad (ISRR)
Indiana Southwestern Railway (ISW) 
Kankakee, Beaverville and Southern Railroad (KBSR)
Also operates the Bee Line Railroad (BLEX)
Kendallville Terminal Railway (KTR)
Lake Michigan and Indiana Railroad (LMIC)
Landisville Terminal & Transfer Company (LVTT)
Louisville and Indiana Railroad (LIRC)
Lucas Oil Rail Line (LORL)
City of Madison Port Authority:
Operates the Madison Railroad (CMPA)
MG Rail (MGRI)
Norfolk Southern Corporation through 1 subsidiary:
Norfolk Southern Railway (NS)
Ohio Valley Railroad (OVR)
R.J. Corman Railroad/Western Ohio Lines (RJCW)
R.J. Corman Railroad/St Mary's Lines (RJSM)
South Chicago and Indiana Harbor Railway (SCIH)
Southern Indiana Railway (SIND)
Southwind Shortline Railway (SWRX)
Squaw Creek Southern Railroad (SCS)
Toledo, Peoria and Western Railway (TPW)
U S Rail Corporation (USRP):
Operates the Kokomo Grain Company
Operates the Winamac Southern Railway (WSRY)
Vermilion Valley Railroad (VVRR)
Wabash Central Railroad (WBCR)

Private freight carriers
BP
City of Auburn Port Authority
Steel Dynamics
Yankeetown Docks Corporation (YDCX)

Passenger carriers

Amtrak (AMTK)
[[Carthage, Kni
ghtstown and Shirley Railroad]] (CKSI)
Indiana Railway Museum
Indiana Transportation Museum (ITM, ITMZ)
Operates the Hoosier Heritage Port Authority (HHPA)
Northern Indiana Commuter Transportation District:
Operates the South Shore Line
Whitewater Valley Railroad
Nickel Plate Express

Defunct railroads

Electric

Notes

References

Indiana Department of Transportation: 2008 Indiana Railroad Map
Association of American Railroads: Railroads in Indiana
Richard S. Simons and Francis Haywood Parker, Railroads of Indiana, Indiana University Press, 1997,

External links
 Indiana Railroads collection, Rare Books and Manuscripts, Indiana State Library

 
 
Indiana
Railroads